The Carabayo (Caraballo) language is spoken by the Carabayo people, also known as Yuri and Aroje, an uncontacted Amazonian people of Colombia living in at least three long houses, one of several suspected uncontacted peoples living along the Rio Puré (now the Río Puré National Park) in the southeastern corner of the country. They are known as the Aroje to the Bora people. Maku and Macusa are pejorative Arawak terms applied to many local languages, not anything specific to Carabayo. The name "Carabayo" is taken from a mock name, "Bernardo Caraballo", given to a Carabayo man during his captivity in the Capuchin mission at La Pedrera in 1969. It has been reported that their self-designation is Yacumo.

Classification
It is often assumed that the Carabayo language and people are a continuation of the Yuri language and people attested from the same area in the 19th century. Indeed, Colombian government publications speak of the "Yuri (Carabayo)", "Carabayo (Yuri)", or "Yuri, Aroje, or Carabayo" as a single people. However, the only information on the Carabayo language was obtained when a family was kidnapped during a violent encounter and held in a mission for several weeks.  During this time, one of the priests wrote down words that he overheard, or that were used in exchanges with him, sometimes with a context that suggested their meaning.  Fifty words were collected; excluding Spanish words like tabako that were picked up during captivity, and two words from the old lingua franca Nheengatu, kariba 'white man' and tupana 'God' (forms also shared with Yuri), there are 25 words recorded with a gloss or context. Several of these have good comparisons with Yuri or its sister language Ticuna:

According to Seifart & Echeverri (2014), the greater number of matches with Tikuna reflects the poverty of the data for Yuri, and the fact that Yuri speakers could not be interviewed to elicit matches, and they were able to do with Tikuna speakers.  The fact that Tikuna speakers were able to recognize some of the Carabayo phrases suggests the languages are, or were once, part of a dialect continuum.  However, Carabayo matches Yuri in having initial  where Tikuna has  ('bring', 'yes', 'wait'), suggesting that Carabayo may be closer to Yuri (whether or not a direct descendant of Yuri) than to Tikuna. Seifart & Echeverri (2014) conclude that the Carabayo likely descended from the Yuri and voluntarily isolated themselves during the Amazon rubber boom at the turn of the 20th century, when atrocities were being committed against the local indigenous peoples on a massive scale.

References

Ticuna–Yuri languages
Unclassified languages of South America